The Mumbai Central–Valsad Fast Passenger is a passenger train belonging to Western Railway zone that runs between  and . It is currently being operated with 59023/59024 train numbers on a daily basis.

Flying Ranee and this Passenger are only Non-AC Double Decker rake are used.

Average speed and frequency 

The 59023/Mumbai Central–Valsad Fast Passenger runs with an average speed of 41 km/hr and covers 195 km in 4h 45m. The 59024/Valsad–Mumbai Central Fast Passenger runs with an average speed of 44 km/h and completes 195 km in 4h 20m.

Route and halts 

The important halts of the train are:

Coach composition

The train has standard ICF rakes with max speed of 110 kmph. The train consists of 10 coaches:

 8 General Unreserved
 2 Seating cum Luggage Rake

Traction

Both trains are hauled by a Valsad Loco Shed-based WAG-5P or Vadodara Loco Shed-based WAP-4E electric locomotive from Mumbai to Valsad and vice versa.

See also 

 Mumbai Central railway station
 Valsad railway station
 Flying Ranee

Notes

References

External links 

 59023/Mumbai Central–Valsad Fast Passenger India Rail Info
 59024/Valsad–Mumbai Central Fast Passenger India Rail Info

Transport in Mumbai
Transport in Valsad
Rail transport in Maharashtra
Rail transport in Gujarat
Slow and fast passenger trains in India